The New York Pathological Society is a professional organization for pathologists in New York State. It was organized in 1844 and incorporated in 1886. In 1908, its membership was approximately 215. It published the journal Proceedings of the New York Pathological Society at various times from 1875 until 1955.


Presidents of the Society 

The first president of the society was Dr. John A. Swett in 1844. Other notable presidents include James R. Wood (1848, 1857), William H. Van Buren (1850), Edmund Randolph Peaslee (1858), John C. Dalton (1859), Alfred C. Post (1861), Abraham Jacobi (1864), Gurdon Buck (1865), Lewis Albert Sayre (1869), Alfred L. Loomis (1871, 1872), Hermann Knapp (1874), Francis Delafield (1875), Edward G. Janeway (1877), Edward L. Keyes (1879), George Frederick Shrady, Sr. (1883, 1884), John A. Wyeth (1885, 1886),
T. Mitchell Prudden (1887), Hermann Biggs (1891), William H. Park (1903), James Ewing (1921), and Virginia Kneeland Frantz (1949, 1950).

References

External links 
 

Pathology organizations
Medical associations based in the United States
Scientific organizations established in 1844
1844 establishments in New York (state)